Ana Maria Bărbosu (born 26 July 2006) is a Romanian artistic gymnast. She is the 2020 European junior team and all-around champion and the 2020 Romanian national all-around silver medalist

Career

Junior

2017 
Bărbosu competed in the Junior II Level 3 division at the 2017 Romanian Junior Championships, finishing fourth in the all-around. In event finals, she was fifth on vault and fourth on uneven bars, before she earned a silver medal on balance beam and a bronze medal on floor.

2019 
Bărbosu opened her season at the domestic Petrom Cup in June, winning gold in the all-around ahead of Sabrina Voinea and Maria Ceplinschi. She then won gold in the Espoir division at the 2019 Romanian Junior Championships the following week, again ahead of Voinea and Amalia Petre in third. At the senior Championships in September, Bărbosu won bronze in the all-around and on floor, while also placing sixth on vault and balance beam and seventh on uneven bars. The following month, at the Romanian Individual Championships, she nearly swept the Espoir division, winning titles in the all-around and on every event but vault, where she won silver behind Voinea.

Bărbosu made her junior international debut in November at the Swiss Cup in Wallisellen, where she won gold with the Romanian team and individually in the all-around. She finished in the top two on every event. Bărbosu competed at the Horizon Cup in Thessaloniki, Greece the following week, where she won the Espoir 2006 all-around title after posting the top score on every event but uneven bars. She finished her international season at Top Gym in Charleroi, Belgium at the end of the month, where the combined Romanian/Singaporean team finished fourth. Individually, Bărbosu won the silver medal in the all-around between Russians Vladislava Urazova and Elena Gerasimova. In event finals, she won silver on floor, bronze on beam, and tied for bronze on bars with Lilou Besson of France.

2020 
Due to the COVID-19 pandemic, gymnasts had limited international competitive opportunities. At the 2020 Romanian Championships, Bărbosu won the silver medal behind Silviana Sfiringu and ahead of Ioana Stănciulescu to finish as the highest-placing junior in the combined all-around final. In the junior division, she again won all-around gold and also swept the event titles. As a result, Bărbosu was named to the nominative team for the 2020 European Junior Championships alongside Iulia Trestianu, Maria Ceplinschi, Andreea Preda, and Luiza Popa.

At Junior Euros, Bărbosu led the Romanian team to a gold medal finish of more than 10 points ahead of Ukraine and Hungary. Individually, she won the all-around title by over 4 points ahead of teammate Ceplinschi and Daniela Batrona of Ukraine and qualified first into all four of the event finals. She then won gold in all four event finals.

2021
At the Romanian Championships in September, Bărbosu won the gold medal on the uneven bars, and took the silver on floor as well as in the all-around. In November, she competed at the Top Gym Tournament in Belgium, where she won the all-around, and also picked up the gold medals in the uneven bars and balance beam finals.

Senior

2022
Bărbosu became age-eligible for senior competition in 2022, and made her senior debut at the City of Jesolo Trophy, where she finished fourteenth in the all-around and eighth on the uneven bars. She then competed at the Osijek World Challenge Cup, where she won the gold medal on floor exercise, and took the bronze on balance beam behind Pauline Schäfer and Ana Đerek. At the European Championships in Munich, Bărbosu finished seventh in the all-around, fourth on floor, and eighth on the balance beam. Ana qualified to the beam final in first place. In the floor final she scored a 13.633. Additionally, she helped Romania qualify a full team for the 2022 World Championships in Liverpool.  In October Bărbosu competed at the Mersin Challenge Cup where she won gold on uneven bars, balance beam, and floor exercise. At the 2022 World Championships in Liverpool Bărbosu finished 20th in the all around final.

Competitive history

References

External links 
 

2006 births
Living people
Romanian female artistic gymnasts
Sportspeople from Focșani
European champions in gymnastics
21st-century Romanian women